Dobków may refer to the following places in Poland:
Dobków, Lower Silesian Voivodeship (south-west Poland)
Dobków, Łódź Voivodeship (central Poland)